Lester Laurie Paul (11 January 1881 – 23 February 1957) was an Australian rules footballer who played with Melbourne in the Victorian Football League (VFL).

Notes

External links 

 

1881 births
1957 deaths
Australian rules footballers from Victoria (Australia)
Melbourne Football Club players
People educated at Wesley College (Victoria)